Mziwmkosi Ronald Siwani (16 September 1980 – 3 August 2013) was a South African cricketer. He played two List A matches for North West in 2002/03.

References

External links
 

1980 births
2013 deaths
South African cricketers
North West cricketers
Sportspeople from Qonce
Cricketers from the Eastern Cape